"No One" is a song by British singer Maverick Sabre, from his debut studio album Lonely Are the Brave. It was released as a digital download in the United Kingdom on 3 February 2012. The song entered the UK Singles Chart at number 50.

Music video
A music video to accompany the release of "No One" was first released onto YouTube on 23 January 2012 at a total length of three minutes and thirty-four seconds.

Track listing

Chart performance

Release history

References

2012 singles
Maverick Sabre songs
2012 songs
Song recordings produced by Fraser T. Smith
Mercury Records singles
Songs written by Fraser T. Smith